Michel Kreek (born 16 January 1971) is a Dutch former professional footballer who played as a defender. He made one international appearance for the Netherlands national team: on 22 February 1995, in a 1–0 friendly loss against Portugal.

He was part of Frank de Boer's backroom staff at Inter Milan.

Coaching career
After retiring, Kreek immediately began his coaching career at Ajax' academy. He worked in several positions at Ajax' academy until his departure in the summer 2013, where he joined Almere City as U19 manager. Beside that, he would also be the head responsible of Almere's academy. In the 2015-16 season, Kreek also functioned as assistant coach for the Dutch U-19 national team.

In August 2016, Kreek was appointed assistant coach to Frank de Boer at Italian club Inter Milan. However, de Boer and his staff, including Kreek, was fired in the beginning of November 2016.

In November 2017, Kreek was named assistant coach to Sarina Wiegman at the Netherlands women's national team. In addition to his duties as assistant coach of the Dutch women's team, he was also appointed manager of the U-20 women's team in March 2018 ahead  He left the position in July 2019 to re-join Ajax, this time as a youth coordinator. In June 2021, he promoted to assistant coach for Jong Ajax under manager Johnny Heitinga.

Honours
Ajax
 Dutch Championship: 1990, 1994
 Dutch Cup: 1993
 Dutch Super Cup: 1993
 UEFA Cup: 1992
 Trofeo Santiago Bernabéu: 1992

References

External links
 
  Profile

Living people
1971 births
Dutch footballers
Netherlands international footballers
Association football defenders
AFC Ajax players
Calcio Padova players
A.C. Perugia Calcio players
SBV Vitesse players
Willem II (football club) players
AEK Athens F.C. players
Footballers from Amsterdam
Dutch expatriate footballers
Expatriate footballers in Italy
Expatriate footballers in Greece
Serie A players
Eredivisie players
Super League Greece players
AFC Ajax non-playing staff
UEFA Cup winning players